Bahar Güvenç (born January 15, 1997) is a Turkish women's football defender currently playing in the First League for 1207 Antalya Sporr with jersey number 3. She was a member of the Turkey girls' U-17 and Turkey women's U-19 teams.  Currently, she is part of the Turkey women's team.

Bahar Güvenç is a student of physical education and sports at Akdeniz University.

Career

Club
Güvenç obtained her license for her hometown club Antalyaspor on March 18, 2010. She began to play in the Turkish Women's First League's 2010–11 season. Two seasons later, her team was relegated to the Second League. She enjoyed her team's promotion to the First League in the 2015–16 season. She captains the team in the 2017–18 season.

In October 2018, she transferred to Kdz. Ereğli Belediye Spor.

She returned to her hometown club 1207 Antalya Spor in the 2020–21 Turkcell Women's Football League season.

International

Güvenç was admitted to the Turkey girls U-17 team, and debuted in the UEFA Development Tournament match against Azerbaijan on April 19, 2012. She capped in total 17 times for the Turkey U-17.

On November 26, 2013, she appeared for the first time for the Turkey women's U-19 team in the friendly match against Azerbaijan. She played in 30 matches.

She made her debut for the Turkey women's team in the UEFA Women's Euro 2017 qualifying Group 5 match against Germany on April 8, 2016.

Career statistics
.

Honours
 Turkish Women's Second League
 1207 Antalyaspor
 Winners (1): 2014–15

References

External links

 

Living people
1997 births
Sportspeople from Antalya
Akdeniz University alumni
Turkish women's footballers
Women's association football defenders
Turkey women's international footballers
1207 Antalya Spor players
Turkish Women's Football Super League players
21st-century Turkish women